MDDL (Market Data Definition Language) is an XML-based messaging format for exchanging information related to
 Financial Instruments
 Corporate events related to the financial instruments
 Market-related data

MDDL was developed by FISD (Financial Information Services Division) of SIIA (Software & Information Industry Association). The initiative for the use of XML in market data exchange was started in 2000 and has been gaining industry-wide acceptance.

External links 
 archived MDDL web site (9-2-2014)
 The Book: MDDL and the Quest for a Market Data Standard
Financial industry XML-based standards
Financial software